Cala Salada is a cove on the Spanish island of Ibiza.

Gallery

References

Beaches of Ibiza
Beaches of the Balearic Islands

ca:Cala Sant Vicent